Filmishmish (في المشمش) is an Arabic term meaning "in the time of the apricots" or "when the apricots bloom", which is taken nonliterally to mean the equivalent of the English phrases "wishful thinking" or "when pigs fly."

Arabic words and phrases